Vyacheslav Belov (born 17 April 1983 in Perm, Russia) is a Russian professional ice hockey defenceman currently playing for Shakhter Soligorsk in the Belarusian Hockey League (BXL).

References

External links

1983 births
Living people
Zauralie Kurgan players
HC Mechel players
Atlant Moscow Oblast players
Avangard Omsk players
HC Sibir Novosibirsk players
HC Spartak Moscow players
Russian ice hockey defencemen
Salavat Yulaev Ufa players
Traktor Chelyabinsk players
HC Lada Togliatti players
Sportspeople from Perm, Russia